The World Bektashi Congress, formerly called the National Congress of the Bektashi before the 1990s, is a conference during which leading members of the Bektashi Order make important decisions. It has been held in Albania since 1921.

Since 1945, the National Congress of the Bektashi has been held exclusively at the World Headquarters of the Bektashi in Tirana. The longest gap between two congresses lasted from 1950 to 1993, when congresses could not be held during Communist rule in Albania.

List of Congresses

Summary
A summary of congresses is given below.

1st Congress
The First National Congress of the Bektashi was held on 14–17 January 1921 at the tekke of Prishta in the Skrapar region. The name Komuniteti Bektashian (Bektashi community) was adopted. Attendees also announced that the Bektashi were the first religious community in Albania to be free of foreign domination, hence breaking relations with the Bektashi in Turkey. Kamber Ali and Ali Baba of Tomorr (Baba Ali Tomorri) helped organized the congress.

Bektashi leaders who attended the 1st Congress included:
Baba Ali Tomorri
Abaz Hilmi Dedej
Ali Kamber Prishta
Baba Selim Gjirokastra (Sulejman bey Delvina) of the Hajdërije tekke of Gjirokastra (b. 1884; d. 1932), a representative of the new Albanian government
Baba Ahmet Turani (1854–1928), the head of the congress
Fehim Zavalani

At the 1st Congress, representatives from local tekkes included:

2nd Congress
The Second National Congress of the Bektashi was held on 8–9 July 1924 at the Hajdërije tekke (also known as the tekke of Haxhi Baba Sulejman) in Gjirokastra. Baba Ahmet Turani served as the head of the congress, while Rexheb Baba of Gjirokastra (1901–1995) served as the secretary general of the congress. In the wake of Atatürk's Reforms, the Bektashi of Turkey began to consider transferring their world headquarters to Albania, and decided that religious ceremonies could be conducted in either Albanian or Turkish. The Bektashis at the 2nd Congress also announced their official separation from the Sunni community in Albania. During the 2nd Congress, the attendees decided that laypeople should be preached to and taught in their mother tongue, such as Albanian or other local vernacular languages.

Bektashi leaders who attended the 2nd Congress included:
Baba Selim Gjirokastra
Baba Ali Kamber Prishta
Baba Ahmet Turani
Baba Xhaferr Sadik
Baba Abaz Hilmi

3rd Congress
Following the exodus of the Bektashi Order to Albania from the newly formed Republic of Turkey when Atatürk's Reforms banned all dervish orders in 1925, the Third National Congress of the Bektashi was held on 23 September 1929 at the tekke of Turan near Korça. Baba Zylfo of Melçan was the head of the congress. At the congress, the Bektashi declared themselves to be a religious community autonomous from other Islamic communities. They also declared the establishment of the kryegjysh and that the Kryegjyshata would be their new headquarters in Tirana.

Bektashi leaders who attended the 3rd Congress included Sali Njazi and Abaz Hilmi. Kamber Ali was the head of the congress, and Ali Baba of Tomorr also helped organized the congress.

4th Congress
The Fourth National Congress of the Bektashi was held on 5 May 1945 at the World Headquarters of the Bektashi in Tirana. Xhafer Sadiku Dede was made Kryegjysh (or Dedebaba) of the Bektashi community, and the influential Baba Faja Martaneshi, a Communist collaborator, was appointed as the secretary general of the congress. Dede Rustem Melçani, the head of the tekke of Melçan, was also one of the secretaries of the congress.

Bektashi leaders who attended the 4th Congress included Abaz Hilmi and Xhafer Sadik. Since the conservative cleric Abaz Hilmi did not support the Communists' proposed liberal reforms, Xhafer Sadik, who had fought with pro-Communist fighters during World War II, was instead appointed by the Communists to preside over the congress.

5th Congress
The Fifth National Congress of the Bektashi was held on 16 April 1950 at the World Headquarters of the Bektashi in Tirana. It was the last congress to be held during the People's Socialist Republic of Albania.

Bektashi leaders who attended the 5th Congress included Ahmet Myftar and Ibrahim Hasnaj (Sekretar i Përgjithshëm i Kryegjyshatës or Secretary General).

6th Congress
The Sixth Congress was held on 19–20 July 1993 at the World Headquarters of the Bektashi in Tirana. It was the first Congress held since the fall of Communism in Albania. At the congress, Reshat Bardhi was elected as the Kryegjysh of the Bektashi community.

Important attendees of the 5th Congress included:

Baba Rexhebi
Tomorr Aliko (Sekretar i përgjithshëm i kryegjyshatës or Secretary General)
Hirësia e tij (His Beatitude) Anastas Janullatos
Hafiz Sabri Koçi (Kryetar i Komunitetit Myslyman or "Islamic community chairman")
Imzot Rrok Mirdita
Dede Reshat Bardhi
Mother Teresa

7th Congress
The Seventh World Bektashi Congress was held on 23–24 September 2000 at the World Headquarters of the Bektashi in Tirana.

Dede Reshat Bardhi presided over the 7th Congress. Many topics were devoted to forging new relations between the Bektashi community and other Muslim communities such as the Alevis.

8th Congress
The Eighth World Bektashi Congress was held on 21 September 2005 at the World Headquarters of the Bektashi in Tirana.

Bektashi leaders who attended the 8th Congress included Baba Edmond Brahimaj and Dede  Reshat Bardhi.

9th Congress
The Ninth World Bektashi Congress was held on 6 July 2009 at the World Headquarters of the Bektashi in Tirana.

See also
Islam in the People's Socialist Republic of Albania

References

External links
The Bektashi Congresses 

Bektashi Order
Recurring events established in 1921
Cultural conferences
 1945